Dipoma is a genus of flowering plants belonging to the family Brassicaceae.

Its native range is China.

Species:
 Dipoma iberideum Franch.

References

Brassicaceae
Brassicaceae genera